John Brady may refer to:

Politicians 
 John Brady (Australian politician) (1904–1993), former member of the Western Australian Legislative Assembly from 1948 to 1974
 John Brady (Indiana politician) (1803–1884), former mayor of Muncie, Indiana
 John Brady (Minnesota politician), mayor of Mankato, Minnesota
 John Brady (MP) (1812–1887), Irish physician and MP for Leitrim
 John Brady (Sinn Féin politician) (born 1973), Irish Sinn Féin politician from Wicklow
 John F. Brady (politician) (born 1959), Delaware attorney and politician
 John Green Brady (1847–1918), Governor of Alaska Territory 1897–1906
 John Banks Brady, British-born Southern Rhodesian soldier, educator and politician
 John Leeford Brady, American lawyer, politician, and newspaper editor
 John C. Brady, 1887 mayor of Erie, Pennsylvania
 Johnny Brady (born 1948), Irish Fianna Fáil politician from Meath

Sportspeople
 John Brady (basketball) (born 1954), Arkansas State, LSU and Samford men's basketball coach
 John Brady (footballer) (1932–2022), Australian rules footballer with North Melbourne
 Jon Brady (born 1975), Australian soccer player

Others 
 John Brady (author) (died 1814), English clerk and author
 John Brady (bishop of Boston) (1842–1910), auxiliary bishop
 John Brady (bishop of Perth) (1800–1871), Roman Catholic bishop in Australia
 John Brady (showman), Australian showman who has appeared in films and in the show ring, as an expert with rope tricks and whip cracking
 John F. Brady (chemical engineer) (born 1954), American professor of chemical engineering
 John J. Brady (1899–1951), American baseball player, coach, and sportswriter
 John Joseph Brady (born 1942), American writer
 John R. Brady (1822–1891), American judge
 John Thomas Brady (1830–1890), businessman in Houston
 John W. Brady (1869–1943), American judge
 John Brady, musician who performed in Swing Kids, Spanakorzo and Sweep the Leg Johnny

See also
 Seán Brady (disambiguation) for people using the Irish version of the name John